William Avner Paschal Jr. (May 28, 1921 – May 25, 2003) was an American football running back in the National Football League for the New York Giants and the Boston Yanks.

Early life
Paschal was born in Atlanta, Georgia and attended Tech High School, where he played football and track.  He then played briefly at Georgia Tech before injuring his knee.  After the injury, he left school and went to work as a railroad switchman in Georgia.

Professional career
After his knee healed, Paschal got a tryout with the New York Giants on the recommendation of the sportswriter Grantland Rice and eventually signed with New York in 1943 for $1,500.  He became the first player to win consecutive rushing championships in the NFL, gaining 572 yards on 147 carries in his rookie year and 737 yards on 196 rushes in his second year.  He also led the league in rushing touchdowns both years, with ten in 1943 and nine in 1944.  

Paschal was then traded to the Boston Yanks during the 1947 season and played through 1948, before retiring.  He gained 2,430 yards with 28 rushing touchdowns for his career.

Personal life
Paschal and his wife, Carolyn had four daughters and a son.

See also

History of the New York Giants (1925-1978)

References

External links
 

1921 births
2003 deaths
Players of American football from Atlanta
American football running backs
Georgia Tech Yellow Jackets football players
New York Giants players
Boston Yanks players